XHRE-FM is a radio station in Piedras Negras, Coahuila, Mexico. Broadcasting on 105.5 FM, XHRE is operated by Grupo Radiorama and carries its Vida Romántica with a romantic format.

History
The concession for XHRE was issued on March 23, 1971 to Ricardo Octavio Elizondo Cedillo. It was originally proposed to operate on 97.3 MHz.

In 2017, Súper Medios de Coahuila sold XHRE to XHMED, S.A. de C.V. and sister XHSL to Master Radiodifusión, S.A. de C.V., with the two stations remaining under common operation. After 14 years with Exa FM, XHRE dropped the format and became Éxtasis Digital, operated by the city's Radiorama cluster.

In 2021, the Radiorama cluster was leased to Grupo RCG; the brand and format were retained. In April 30, 2022, 3 years later eliminating as Éxtasis Digital and became  and ended in July. On August 15, the station launched a romantic station as Vida Romántica, and previously aired on XHSG-FM 99.9.

References

1971 establishments in Mexico
Radio stations established in 1971
Radio stations in Coahuila
Spanish-language radio stations